Mel Brown (October 7, 1939March 20, 2009) was an American-born blues guitarist and singer. He is best remembered for his decade long backing of Bobby Bland, although in his own right, Brown recorded over a dozen albums between 1967 and 2006.

Career
Brown was born in Jackson, Mississippi, United States, and was presented with his first guitar as a teenager while recovering from a bout of meningitis.  By 1955, after performing backing duties for both Sonny Boy Williamson II and Jimmy Beasley, Brown had a two year long stint backing Johnny Otis. This led to work with Etta James, where he swapped his Gibson Les Paul for an ES-175 to give him a richer and fuller tone to his guitar work, that set him apart from his contemporaries.

The stress of constant touring led him to Los Angeles, California, to resume work with Otis, spending an extended residency at the Club Sands. Further session duties saw Brown back Bobby Darin and Bill Cosby among others, as well as performing on T-Bone Walker's Funky Town. ABC Records producer Bob Thiele offered Brown the chance to record his own material, and Brown released Chicken Fat in 1967. Though principally a blues musician, Brown would also transition into jazz and soul jazz through his association with Bob Thiele, including a prominent role with the Oliver Nelson Big Band and appearing on Live from Los Angeles released by Impulse.

One of Brown's most celebrated tracks is the 11+ minute guitar solo, "Eighteen Pounds of Unclean Chitlings", which features on I'd Rather Suck My Thumb (1970), and was reissued as the lead track (and title) on a BluesWay Records collection released in 1973.
For many years in the 1980s and 1990s, Brown was a prominent member of the house band at Antone's Night Club in Austin, Texas.

Brown was nominated for a Juno Award in both 2001 and 2002.

Brown died aged 69, on March 20, 2009, in Kitchener, Ontario, of complications from emphysema.

A documentary film, Love Lost & Found: The Story of Mel Brown directed by Sean Jasmins for Blue Fusion Productions was granted a theatrical release in 2014.

Discography

As leader
 1967: Chicken Fat (Impulse!)
 1968: The Wizard (Impulse!)
 1969: Blues for We (Impulse!)
 1969: I'd Rather Suck My Thumb (Impulse!)
 1971: Mel Brown's Fifth (Impulse!)
 1973: Big Foot Country Girl (Impulse!)
 1973: Eighteen Pounds of Unclean Chitlins and Other Greasy Blues Specialties (BluesWay)
 1998: Can't Stop Blowin''' (Electro-Fi) Snooky Pryor with special guest Mel Brown
 1999: Neck Bones & Caviar (Electro-Fi) Mel Brown
 2000: Double Shot!  (Electro-Fi) Snooky Pryor and Mel Brown
 2001: Homewreckin’ Done Live (Electro-Fi) Mel Brown and The Homewreckers
 2006: Blues – A Beautiful Thing (Electro-Fi) Mel Brown and The Homewreckers
 2006: Mel Brown – The DVD (Electro-Fi)

As sideman
Clifford Coulter – East Side San Jose (Impulse!, 1970)
Clifford Coulter – Do It Now! (Impulse!, 1971)
B.B. King... L.A. Midnight – Guitar
B.B. King and Bobby Blue Bland – Together for the First Time – Guitar
Albert Collins – Cold Snap – Guitar
James Cotton – Mighty Long Time – Piano
Lightnin' Hopkins – It’s a Sin To Be Rich – Guitar, Organ, Electric Piano
John Lee Hooker – Endless Boogie – Acoustic Guitar
John Lee Hooker  Never Get Out of The Blues Alive – Guitar and Bass
Jimmy McGriff – The Starting Five (Milestone, 1987) - Guitar
Jimmy McGriff - The Dream Team (Milestone, 1997)  – Guitar
Doug Sahm – Juke Box Music – Keyboards
Earl Hooker – Simply The Best – Guitar
Charles Brown – Legend – Guitar
T-Bone Walker – Stormy Monday Blues (BluesWay, 1968)
T-Bone Walker - Funky Town (BluesWay, 1969)
Monica Dupont – Monica Dupont Vintage (1980) – Guitar
Little Bobby and The Jumpstarts – Tickets in the Glovebox – Piano, Guitar
Harmonica Shah – Listen At Me Good'' – Guitar

References

External links
 Biography @ Electrofi.com
 Facebook page for Documentary Film Love Lost & Found: The Story of Mel Brown
 Jimmie Vaughan Remembers Mel Brown
 

1939 births
2009 deaths
Canadian people of African-American descent
African-American guitarists
20th-century African-American male singers
American blues guitarists
American rhythm and blues guitarists
American male guitarists
Deaths from emphysema
Singers from Mississippi
Impulse! Records artists
American emigrants to Canada
Black Canadian musicians
Canadian blues guitarists
Canadian male guitarists
20th-century Canadian male singers
20th-century American guitarists
Guitarists from Mississippi
20th-century Canadian guitarists